Quercus tomentella, the island oak, island live oak, or Channel Island oak, is an oak in the section Protobalanus. It is native to six islands: five of the Channel Islands of California and Guadalupe Island, part of Baja California.

It is placed in Quercus section Protobalanus.

Description
The mature tree has a grayish to reddish brown trunk with scaly, furrowed bark. The twigs are reddish and covered in woolly hairs. The leathery leaf blades are often concave and are an oblong lance shape or oval with pointed or rounded tips. The edges are smooth or toothed. The upper surfaces are dark green and lightly hairy when new, losing the hairs over time. The undersides are gray-green and coated in woolly hairs, becoming less woolly with age. The acorn grows singly or in pairs. The nut is up to 3.5 cm with a rounded tip.

Distribution and habitat
It is native to six islands: five of the Channel Islands of California (Anacapa Island, San Clemente Island, Santa Catalina Island, Santa Cruz Island, and Santa Rosa Island) and Guadalupe Island, part of the State of Baja California.

This species is a relict. Though it is now limited to the islands, it was once widespread in mainland California, as evidenced by the many late Tertiary fossils of the species found there. Recently, it was found that there was a high genetic variability across many of the Q. tomentella populations, but this variation was not evenly distributed.

Ecology
Island oak hybridizes with canyon live oak (Quercus chrysolepis).

Conservation
The island oak was listed as an endangered species by the International Union for Conservation of Nature.

The species is threatened by overgrazing from nonnative ungulates. The most rapid declines have occurred on Guadalupe Island. The trees there are apparently no longer reproducing. Feral goats have been abundant on the island for at least 150 years. The animals have eliminated much of the native vegetation and caused extensive soil erosion. Fenced enclosures have been helpful in the early recovery of some of the local flora.

References

External links

photo of herbarium specimen at Missouri Botanical Garden, collected in Guadalupe Island in 1875

tomentella
Flora of California
Trees of Baja California
Natural history of the Channel Islands of California
Natural history of the California chaparral and woodlands
Trees of the Southwestern United States
Trees of mild maritime climate
Trees of Mediterranean climate
Garden plants of North America
Drought-tolerant trees
Ornamental trees
Oaks of Mexico